The Central District of Komijan County is a district (bakhsh) in Komijan County, Markazi Province, Iran. At the 2006 census, its population was 26,749, in 6,973 families.  The District has one city: Komijan. The District has three rural districts (dehestan): Esfandan Rural District and Khenejin Rural District.

References 

Komijan County
Districts of Markazi Province